Take My Wife is a British television sitcom produced by Granada Television. It ran for a single series of six episodes in 1979.

The cast included Duggie Brown as Harvey Hall, a northern stand-up comic, and Elisabeth Sladen as Josie, his higher-born wife. The series was written by Anthony Couch, directed by Gordon Flemyng and produced by John G. Temple.

Cast 
 Duggie Brown as Harvey Hall
 Elisabeth Sladen as Josie Hall
 Victor Spinetti as Maurie Watkins
 Toni Palmer as Doreen Underhill
 Joan Benham as Mabel Norrington

References

1979 British television series debuts
1979 British television series endings
ITV sitcoms
Television shows produced by Granada Television
English-language television shows